Magic Mountain is the fourth studio album by American rock band Black Stone Cherry. The album was released on May 6, 2014. It was the band's last release with Roadrunner Records before their departure from the label and signing with Mascot Records a year later.

Reception
The album holds a Metacritic rating of 76 out of 100 based on four reviews, indicating "generally favorable reviews."

The album debuted at No.22 on the Billboard 200 chart, selling 13,000 copies in the United States in its first week of release. The album has sold 41,000 copies in the United States as of March 2016.
It debuted in the United Kingdom at No. 5.

Track listing

Mastered by Ted Jensen at Sterling Sound, NYC

Charts

References

2014 albums
Black Stone Cherry albums
Roadrunner Records albums